Ashley McGuire is a British actress, known for her roles as Big Mandy in the BBC comedy series This Country and Vicky Houghton in the BBC One series This Is Going to Hurt.

Life and career 
McGuire attended Rose Bruford College of Speech and Drama. McGuire has portrayed various TV roles, including Malory Towers, Coronation Street, Dead Boss, Small Axe, Decline and Fall, It's a Sin and Jack and the Beanstalk: After Ever After. She has also appeared as Shakira in Man Down, "Big" Mandy Harris in This Country and Bev Slater in EastEnders.

Her stage work includes Home by Nadia Fall (2012 and 2013), Light Shining in Buckinghamshire (2015) and Top Girls (2019) by Caryl Churchill, Our Country's Good by Timberlake Wertenbaker (2015), and The Suicide by Suhayla El-Bushra (2016), all at the Royal National Theatre. Susannah Clapp, a theatre critic for The Observer, wrote about McGuire's portrayal of Falstaff in Phyllida Lloyd's all-female Henry IV at the Donmar Warehouse (2014): "A magnificent Falstaff... she is glorious. A one-person vindication of the all-female enterprise. If it were needed."

Stage

Filmography

References

External links
 

21st-century British actresses
British soap opera actresses
British stage actresses
British television actresses
Living people
Year of birth missing (living people)
Alumni of Rose Bruford College